Harpocera is a genus of bugs from Miridae family.

Species
Species within this genus include:
Harpocera cypria Wagner, 1968 
Harpocera hellenica Reuter, 1876 
Harpocera thoracica (Fallén, 1807)

References

Mirinae